Blessing Igbojionu   (born 26 September 1982) is a female Nigerian football forward.

She was part of the Nigeria women's national football team  at the 2004 Summer Olympics. 
On club level she played for Pelican Stars.

See also
 Nigeria at the 2004 Summer Olympics

References

External links
 
 

1982 births
Living people
Nigerian women's footballers
Place of birth missing (living people)
Footballers at the 2004 Summer Olympics
Olympic footballers of Nigeria
Women's association football forwards
Nigeria women's international footballers
Pelican Stars F.C. players
Igbo people